Pozo del Tigre is a settlement in northern Argentina. It is located in Formosa Province, 1,300 km from the capital city, Buenos Aires.

Population
The settlement had 3,948 inhabitants at the 2001 census, representing a 58.7% increase over the 2,487 inhabitants recorded in the 1991 census.

2010 tornado
On October 21, 2010, Pozo del Tigre was devastated by a tornado. Six people died and 110 were injured.

References

Populated places in Formosa Province